The Bo language of West Africa, Bomu (Boomu), also identified as Western Bobo Wule, is a Gur language of Burkina Faso and Mali.

Bomu is spoken by two groups of Bwa people, the Red Bobo, Bobo Wule (also spelled Bobo Oule), and the White Bobo, Bobo Gbe, also known as Kyan (also spelled Kian, Tian, Tyan, Can, Chan) or Tyanse.

References

Bwa languages (Gur)
Languages of Burkina Faso
Languages of Mali